The 1960 Saskatchewan Roughriders finished in fifth place (last) in the W.I.F.U. with a 2–12–2 record.  Their six points were six behind the fourth-place BC Lions, and eight points behind the third-place Calgary Stampeders who claimed the third and final playoff spot.

1960 Preseason

On July 28, the Roughriders played the London Lords of the Senior Ontario Rugby Football Union in London, Ontario, and beat their hosts 38–0.

1960 regular season

Season Standings

1960 Season schedule

1960 Preseason

1960 regular season

 The Saskatchewan Roughriders failed to make the playoffs.

1960 CFL Schenley Award Nominees

References

Saskatchewan Roughriders seasons
Saskatchewan Roughriders
1960 Canadian Football League season by team